"Could Have Been Me" is a song by English rock band the Struts. It was released as the first single from their debut studio album Everybody Wants. Originally released in 2013, the song began to increase in popularity as the song rose up the American airplay charts in 2015, peaking at no. 5 on the Alternative Songs chart.

Uses
 The theme song for NXT TakeOver: London.
 The opening song for MLB The Show 16
 Used in a trailer for the 2016 video game Ratchet & Clank.
 In an advertisement for the Mercedes-Benz 2021 E-Class.
 Nicholas Galitzine performs the song alongside Camila Cabello in Cinderella
 Halsey performs the song in the 2021 animated film Sing 2 as her character Porsha Crystal.

Music video
A music video was released on August 22, 2015, directed by Jonas Åkerlund.

Charts

Weekly charts

Year-end charts

Certifications

References

2013 songs
2013 singles
The Struts songs
Interscope Records singles
Music videos directed by Jonas Åkerlund
Songs written by Josh Wilkinson
Songs written by George Tizzard
Song recordings produced by Red Triangle (production team)
Songs written by Rick Parkhouse